This is a list of wars and conflicts involving the region of Kosovo, including the Republic of Kosova, the Kosovo Liberation Army, the United Nations Interim Administration Mission in Kosovo and the current disputed Republic of Kosovo.

References

Kosovo
Wars